Missouri's 9th congressional district was a US congressional district, dissolved in 2013, that last encompassed rural Northeast Missouri, the area known as "Little Dixie," along with the larger towns of Columbia, Fulton, Kirksville and Union.  Boone, Franklin, and a portion of St. Charles County comprise the highest voting centers of the mostly rural district. It was last represented by Republican Blaine Luetkemeyer.

Some of the most famous representatives to represent the 9th congressional district were Speaker of the House Champ Clark;
James Broadhead, the first president of the American Bar Association; Clarence Cannon, chairman of the House Appropriations Committee; Isaac Parker, a judge depicted in True Grit; James Sidney Rollins, known as the "Father of the University of Missouri"; and Kenny Hulshof, unsuccessful candidate to become Governor of Missouri.

Removal following 2010 Census
The district no longer existed in 2013 after Missouri lost a congressional seat following the 2010 census. Initial redistricting maps placed most of the district north of the Missouri River in a redrawn 6th congressional district, and most of the rest of the district in a redrawn 3rd congressional district. The last congressman from the old 9th, Luetkemeyer was subsequently elected to the 3rd.

Voting
George W. Bush defeated John Kerry 59% to 41% in this district in 2004.  In 2008, Rep. Kenny Hulshof announced that he would seek the Republican nomination for Governor of Missouri.  As a whole, the 9th district leaned towards the Republican Party, with the exception being Columbia, which often leans towards the Democratic Party.

List of members representing the district

Election results

1998

2000

2002

2004

2006

2008

2010

References

 Congressional Biographical Directory of the United States 1774–present
 US Census Bureau

09
Former congressional districts of the United States
Constituencies established in 1863
1863 establishments in Missouri
Constituencies disestablished in 1933
1933 disestablishments in Missouri
Constituencies established in 1935
1935 establishments in Missouri
Constituencies disestablished in 2013
2013 disestablishments in Missouri